Mamadou Lamine Camara (born 5 January 2003) is a Senegalese professional footballer who plays as a midfielder for Berkane.

Club career
Born in Dakar, Camara began his career at the Académie Foot Darou Salam. In 2021, he moved to Morocco to sign for RS Berkane.

International career
Camara was first called up to the Senegalese under-20 side in 2019, going on to be named best player at the Tournoi UFOA A U20, which served as qualification for the 2021 Africa U-20 Cup of Nations.

He was called up again to the Senegalese under-20 side for the 2023 Africa U-20 Cup of Nations.

Career statistics

Club

Notes

References

2003 births
Living people
Footballers from Dakar
Senegalese footballers
Senegal youth international footballers
Association football midfielders
RS Berkane players
Senegalese expatriate footballers
Senegalese expatriate sportspeople in Morocco
Expatriate footballers in Morocco